Dario Bergamelli (born 26 April 1987) is an Italian footballer who plays as a defender.

Biography
Bergamelli started his career at Atalanta B.C. He was farmed to Serie C1 and Serie C2 clubs such as Manfredonia

Albinoleffe
In July 2009 Bergamelli along with Michael Cia were exchanged with Nicola Madonna, all in co-ownership deal. Cia was valued at €400,000; Bergamelli €150,000; Madonna €550,000. Bergamelli and Cia signed a 5-year contract. In 2010–11 season, he gave up his no.19 shirt and took no.3 (which the original owner Davide Bombardini took no.10) and gave the no.19 shirt to new signing Andrea Cocco.

In June 2011 Atalanta acquired Madonna outright for €1,500 and sold Bergamelli, Cia and Karamoko Cissé for €500 each.

After AlbinoLeffe relegated in 2012, Bergamelli joined Serie B club Reggina Calcio, along with Mehmet Hetemaj. In June 2013 Reggina did not excised the option to sign them outright. In 2013 Bergamelli was signed by U.S. Cremonese in a temporary deal.

Novara
In July 2014, Bergamelli was signed by Novara Calcio in a 2-year contract.

Catania
On 16 September 2015, Bergamelli and Garufo were sold to Catania.

Ternana
On 31 August 2021, his contract with Ternana was terminated by mutual consent.

References

External links
 AIC profile (data by football.it) 
 

1987 births
Living people
People from Alzano Lombardo
Footballers from Lombardy
Italian footballers
Association football defenders
Serie B players
Serie C players
Serie D players
Atalanta B.C. players
U.S. Salernitana 1919 players
A.C. Monza players
Manfredonia Calcio players
Hellas Verona F.C. players
U.C. AlbinoLeffe players
Reggina 1914 players
U.S. Cremonese players
Novara F.C. players
Catania S.S.D. players
F.C. Pro Vercelli 1892 players
Ternana Calcio players